Girlschool is the eighth studio album by British heavy metal band, Girlschool, released on Communiqué Records and Progressive International in 1992. It is the fourth and last studio album recorded with lead guitarist Cris Bonacci and the only one with bassist Jackie Carrera. It is also the first Girlschool album to be self-produced for an independent British label.

Bonacci released this comment on the album title: "The album was going to be called No Bollocks! But in the end we decided to call it simply Girlschool because we realized we'd never used the name of the band as a title before".

Track listing

Personnel

Band members
Kim McAulliffe – lead and backing vocals, rhythm guitar
Cris Bonacci – lead guitar
Jackie Carrera – bass, backing vocals
Denise Dufort – drums

Additional Musicians
Darren Allison – doholla drum (on "My Ambition")

Production
Nick Addison - engineer
Darren Allison - assistant engineer

References

External links
Official Girlschool discography

1992 albums
Girlschool albums
Hard rock albums by English artists